Mount Carse is a mountain having several peaks, the highest at , standing  north of the head of Drygalski Fjord in the southern part of the Salvesen Range of South Georgia. It was surveyed by the South Georgia Survey (SGS) between 1951 and 1957 and named for V. Duncan Carse, leader of the four SGS expeditions during that period.

The first ascent was made on 21 January 1990 by Brian Davison and Stephen Venables, members of the Southern Ocean Mountaineering Expedition.

References

Literature
 'Island at the Edge of the World' by Stephen Venables.  Hodder & Stoughton 1991

Carse